Barbaria may refer to:

Places
 Barbaria (East Africa), two ancient regions in littoral Northeast Africa
 Barbaria (village), a village in West Bengal, India
 Barbagia, a mountain area of Sardinia (described by Cicero as a land of barbarians)
 Barbary Coast, in northwest Africa
 Cape Barbaria, Formentaria, Balearic Islands, Spain

See also
 Chak Barbaria, a census town in West Bengal India
 Korgoth of Barbaria, a TV pilot episode
 Berbers, an ethnicity of several nations in Africa
 Barbarian (disambiguation)